Sodium is a chemical element with symbol Na and atomic number 11.

Sodium may also refer to:

 Sodium (PlayStation Home), a massively multiplayer online game
 Sodium (horse), a thoroughbred racehorse

See also

 Sodium in biology, for the role of sodium in biology and nutrition
 Saline (medicine), for the medical uses of sodium
 Isotopes of sodium
 Na (disambiguation)